The M33 Helmet (Elmetto Mod. 33 in Italian) is a steel combat helmet designed in the 1930s in Italy, and was the standard combat helmet of the Regio Esercito up to World War II, and of the Esercito Italiano well into the Cold War.

Background 

Dating back from 1925, the Italian Army had engaged in experiments to find a new model of combat helmet that could replace the aging and not completely satisfactory Adrian helmet adopted in 1915; coupled to this was the fact that the Adrian was originally a French design, and it was probably felt (under the fascist regime) that an Italian-designed model was more appropriate. 

In 1932 after lengthy trials (with prototypes from many Italian and foreign firms) it was decided to adopt one of them as the M31 helmet. However this model (recognizable by the small crest on its top) wasn't completely satisfactory, because its cupolar blowhole design wasn't seen as being efficient, and was rather perceived as a structural weakness. By replacing it with three ventilation holes (two on the sides and one on the rear), the Model 33 was born, and was adopted with a circular on November 29, 1934.

Usage 

While not possessing the same degree of protection offered by the German Stahlhelm, the M33 was seen as a successful design, since it offered three times the resistance of the Adrian, was light at 1.2kg, and was relatively comfortable. 

During World War II, it was the main combat helmet of the Italian Army, but lack of resources meant that some second-line troops were issued the Adrian helmet, or even no helmet at all. It continued to serve as the main combat helmet of the Esercito Italiano until the 1990s.

Notes

References
 Filippo Cappellano and Livio Pierallini, L'elmetto mod. 33, in Storia Militare n. 230 (November 2012)

External links

 The M31 and M33 helmet on the Italian Army website [Italian]

Combat helmets of Italy
World War II military equipment of Italy
Combat helmets of Poland
Military equipment introduced in the 1930s